Barty is a surname and, as a given name, a diminutive or short name of Bartholomew or other names, including Barton.

Notable people with the name include:

Given name
 Barton "Barty" Smith (born 1952), American football player

Surname
 Ashleigh Barty (born 1996), Australian tennis player
 Billy Barty (1924–2000), American actor
 Braden Barty (born 1970), American director and producer, son of Billy
 Jack Barty (1888–1942), British actor
 James S. Barty (1806–1875), Scottish minister

Fictional characters
 Bartemius "Barty" Crouch Sr, a fictional politician in the Harry Potter series
 Bartemius "Barty" Crouch Jr, a Death Eater, son of the above character

See also

Bartee, surname
Bharti (name)

Hypocorisms